Futuna-Aniwa is a language spoken in the Tafea Province of Vanuatu on the outlier islands of Futuna and Aniwa. The language has approximately 1,500 speakers. It is a Polynesian language, part of the Austronesian language family.

It is occasionally called West Futunan to distinguish it from East Futunan spoken on the islands of Futuna and Alofi in Wallis and Futuna.

Phonology
The phonology of Futuna-Aniwa is mostly similar to the phonology of Polynesian (Capell, 1984). However, there are some elements that are not consistent in Futuna-Aniwa with Polynesian (Capell, 1984). For example, in Futuna-Aniwa both l and r are present, although Polynesian languages normally have one or the other (Capell, 1984). Similarly, another distinction can be made between /s/ and /ʃ/ in Futuna, and /s/ and /tʃ/ in Aniwa, which is also not normal in Polynesian (Capell, 1984).

 /p/ - Devoiced bilabial unaspirated plosive, initial and medial (Capell, 1984).
 /t/ - Denti-alveolar devoiced unaspirated plosive, initial and medial (Capell, 1984).
 /k/ - Devoiced velar unaspirated plosive, front and back varieties depending on neighbouring vowel but not differing phonemically; initial and medial (Capell, 1984).
 /m/ - Voiced bilabial nasal, initial and medial (Capell, 1984).
 /n/ - Voiced denti-alveolar nasal; initial and medial (Capell, 1984).
 /ŋ/ - Voiced velar nasal, initial and medial (Capell, 1984).
 /f/ - Voiceless bilabial fricative in both languages, but often occurring in Aniwa for Futuna v; initial and medial (Capell, 1984).
 /l/ - Voiced alveolar lateral, fricative, initial, medial (Capell, 1984).
 /r/ - Voiced lingual flapped alveolar consonant, sometimes practically fricative, without phonemic difference (Capell, 1984).
 /s/ - Voiceless alveolar sibilant, initial and medial (Capell, 1984).
 /ʃ/ - Voiceless palato-alveolar fricative with some lip-rounding. Futuna sound, to which /tʃ/ corresponds in Aniwa; initial and medial (Capell, 1984).

 /i/ - High front unrounded vowel, of moderate tenseness, but relaxed (without lowering) if unstressed (Capell, 1984). Occurs in all positions (Capell, 1984).
 /e/ - Open mid front unrounded vowel, phonetically [ɛ] in all positions (Capell, 1984).
 /a/ - Low open vowel in all positions (Capell, 1984).
 /o/ - Open mid back rounded vowel, phonetically [ɔ], occurs in all positions (Capell, 1984).
 /u/ - High back rounded vowel, corresponding to /i/ as regards tenseness; all positions (Capell, 1984). Before and after vowels /i/ and /u/ become semivowels (Capell, 1984).

Looking at the information provided above, it is important to note out the variations of Aniwa compared to Futuna (Capell, 1984). The most important and recognizable variations from a multiple number of other variations is extreme palatalisation of dental consonants before front high and mid vowels, which also in some cases involves n- (Capell, 1984). An example of this is te/ti in Futuna is normally represented as ce/ci in Aniwa (Capell, 1984). Compared to Futuna, in Aniwa the velar plosive is backed more regularly, therefore k, q, and y is heard (Capell, 1984). This is shown most of the time, but there is a little freedom in variation (Capell, 1984). /k/ is retained before front vowels, word-initially, and before diphthongal clusters,  /k/ becomes /q/ before /a/, and /k/ becomes /y/ before /o/ (Capell, 1984). The rule itself first shows that there is consciousness of the word and not just the utterance and secondly, the exceptions may show native ideas of boundaries and junctures (Capell, 1984). These are the main differences between the two dialects, however, it is noted by Capell that the data collected is not accurate or fully reliable from that particular village (Capell, 1984).

Morphology

Pronoun and person markers
Pronouns in Futuna-Aniwa distinguish for four numbers (singular, dual, trial and plural) and for first (inclusive and exclusive), second and third persons (Dougherty, 1983). The distinction of trial and plural in a Polynesian language is an unusual feature of Futuna-Aniwa (Capell, 1984).

There are primarily five different sets of pronominal forms in Futuna-Aniwa: personal, possessive, interrogative, emphatic, and demonstrative. In some circumstances, pronominal clitics will accompany these pronominal forms. (Dougherty, 1983)

Pronouns are not inflected for gender, but can be marked for oblique case (marked by i) and, optionally, subjective case (marked by e). (Dougherty, 1983)

Pronoun construction
Notably, pronouns in Futuna-Aniwa can all be easily can be divided into specific morphological components. For example, the second person nonsingular dual pronoun akorua (see below) is formed by combining the personal article prefix a-, the nonsingular, second person, pronominal focus infix –ko- and the dual suffix –(r)ua. (Dougherty, 1983)

The only exception to this are interrogative pronouns, whose morphological construction is more complex and variable.

Personal pronouns
Personal Pronouns are not obligatory in Futuna-Aniwa and may be omitted where context allows, as evident in example 1.

Possessive pronouns
Pronouns in Futuna-Aniwa can be used to indicate inalienable possession, exclusively for singular persons. These appear immediately before an inalienable head noun. (Dougherty, 1983)

There is also an equivalent “paradigm of personal pronoun suffixes” (Dougherty, 1983, p. 33) that occur in possessive constructions, suffixing onto nouns to indicate possession. Note that example (3) below can also be expressed using the above equivalent inalienable possessive pronouns.

Interrogative pronouns
There are 14 different interrogative pronoun forms in Futuna-Aniwa. Minimally, Futuna-Aniwa distinguishes between singular and nonsingular in all interrogative pronoun constructions. (Dougherty, 1983) Nonsingular interrogative pronouns appear in dual, trial and plural positions. (Capell, 1984)

Emphatic pronouns
Emphatic pronouns in Futuna-Aniwa are used to indicate that the designated referent in a clause is the only referent being referred to. (Dougherty, 1983)

Demonstrative pronouns
Demonstrative pronouns in Futuna-Aniwa distinguish three positions: position near speaker, position near addressee and distant position. They are in essence a grouping of the base demonstrative form and the Futuna-Aniwa article system (Dougherty, 1983). This is further explained in the Demonstratives section below.

Pronominal clitics
Within certain constructions in Futuna-Aniwa pronominal clitics occur alongside pronouns. Pronominal clitics only occur with singular persons and serve the role of cross referencing the subject of a verb. The pronominal clitic is typically suffixed onto tense or aspect markers, negatives in preverbal position or the infinitive (Dougherty, 1983).

Pronominal clitics primarily occur within transitive constructions in Futuna-Aniwa, although not exclusively (Dougherty, 1983). This is evident through comparing example (8) (a transitive construction) with example (9) (an intransitive construction) below. The pronominal clitic is not present in (9), but is suffixed onto the preverbal negative particle in (8).

Note: In (8), the first personal singular was omitted from the original example. It has been included for clarity.

Demonstratives
Demonstratives in Futuna-Aniwa distinguish by location relative to the speaker, with three categories for relative distance: close to the speaker, close to the addressee, and far away from both. In natural speech, the distinction between what is close to the listener and what is far away can sometimes be lost, and the respective demonstrative for each can be used somewhat interchangeably in conversational settings. Most constructions in Futuna-Aniwa use a set of three demonstratives: nei, indicating position near the speaker, na, indicating position near the addressee, and ra, indicating distant position. (Dougherty, 1983, p 27)

These demonstratives can be traced back to Proto-Oceanic *ne, *ta and *wa (Crowley, Lynch and Ross, 2013). Proto-Polynesian has *eni ('this, these'), which has the reflex *teenei ('this') and *(ee)nei ('these') in Proto-Nucelar-Polynesian. This implies an evolution from *ne in Proto-Oceanic, to *eni in Proto-Polynesian, to *teenei and *(ee)nei in PNP, which then became *nei in Futuna-Aniwa. However, Proto-Polynesian also has the marker *ni, referring to location close to the speaker in either time or space; in Proto-Nuclear-Polynesian, this became *nei. Dougherty (1983) lists both of these as origins of Futuna-Aniwa *nei. Their lexical similarity in meaning complements this understanding.

Articles
Demonstratives in Futuna-Aniwa are closely connected to the article system, as noted above in the Pronouns section. Most uses of the demonstratives in the language follow an article, typically used as optional clarifiers for the articles. While articles in Futuna-Aniwa typically go before the noun they modify, articles can also occur after that noun so they occur before a demonstrative. In this way, Futuna-Aniwa's demonstratives follow the nouns they modify, as is typical of most Austronesian languages, particularly in the Vanuatu region, according to the World Atlas of Language Structures. 

As the specific articles of the language distinguish by number, we can pair these articles and demonstratives together to give us the following table, as noted in the Pronouns section:

In the above table, the sounds written correspond to the phonology of Futuna. In Aniwa, the singular would be ce nei, ce na, and ce ra respectively. The singular article in the above table could also be replaced with the singular diminutive ji article, changing in meaning from 'this thing''' to 'this little thing'. (Dougherty, 1983, p 28)

The article te here is one of the three forms of the definite article. Typically, the definite article is ta, however ti is used for a restricted set of words, typically words beginning with a stressed vowel a. Te is the last form of the article and is typically restricted to a set of words that often, but not always, begins with a vowel. When combined with the article te, this vowel can sometimes be deleted. (Dougherty, 1983, p 22)7Te can, however, be used as a demonstrative on its own. It is the only article with which this can occur. In this case, te comes after the noun, which is typical of demonstratives but untypical of articles. It’s used in this manner as an emphatic article.

According to Dougherty, pe can also be used in the article position to specify an unmentioned referent. It is often used when making an example, not dissimilar to English like in a phrase like that or like this.The three key demonstratives can also be used in adjectival phrases, typically after the noun, although occasionally before; it is in these places that they are not bound to the article, whereas usually they would need an article of some kind. (Dougherty, 1983, p 29)

Locative constructions
Demonstratives in Futuna-Aniwa can occur in locative constructions. The constructions use either i, denoting static position, or ki, denoting a motion towards the indicated position, followed by a person marker- either ku first person, or ko non-first person, followed by the relevant demonstrative. In first-person, the demonstrative can be omitted. For example, ikunei indicates a static position, with the first-person marker and the demonstrative indicating near the speaker, meaning ‘here, in this position’; kikora indicates movement (rather than a static position), the non-first person marker, and a distant position, meaning ‘towards there (that distant location)’. In designating position near the speaker, the final element nei is optional. The full table can be found below. (Dougherty, 1983, p. 31)

References
 
 
Crowley, T., Lynch, J. and Ross, M., 2013. The Oceanic Languages''. Hoboken: Taylor and Francis.

External links
 Materials on Futuna-Aniwa are included in the open access Arthur Capell collections (AC1 and AC2) held by Paradisec.

Notes

Futunic languages
Polynesian outliers
Languages of Vanuatu